Cryptandra distigma is a flowering plant in the family Rhamnaceae and is endemic to inland Western Australia. It is a shrub with oblong or narrowly egg-shaped leaves and clusters of white to cream-coloured, tube-shaped flowers.

Description
The upper surface of the leaves is glabrous and the edges are rolled under, concealing the lower surface. Flowering mainly occurs from June to September.

Taxonomy and naming
Cryptandra distigma was first formally described in 1995 by Barbara Lynette Rye and the description was published in the journal Nuytsia. The specific epithet (distigma ) means "double stigma", referring to the two lobes of the stigma.

Distribution and habitat
This cryptandra grows in sand on sandplains and dunes from Kirgell Rocks Station to Widgiemooltha and from Wallaroo to the Queen Victoria Spring Nature Reserve in the Coolgardie, Esperance Plains, Great Victoria Desert, Mallee and Murchison bioregions of Western Australia.

Conservation status
Cryptandra distigma is listed as "not threatened" by the Government of Western Australia Department of Biodiversity, Conservation and Attractions.

References

distigma
Rosales of Australia
Flora of Western Australia
Plants described in 1995
Taxa named by Barbara Lynette Rye